Pimelea treyvaudii, commonly known as grey rice-flower, is a species of shrub in the family Thymelaeaceae. It  has white flowers in spherical heads at the end of branches and is endemic to eastern Australia.

Description
The inflorescence consists of numerous flowers in a spherical shaped head. The pedicel is hairy and the stamens may be longer or shorter than the sepals. The fruit are a dry nut thickly covered with fine hairs and forming into a densely clustered conical head. Flowering occurs from May to February.

Taxonomy and naming
Pimelea treyvaudii was first formally described in 1912 by Alfred James Ewart and Bertha Rees from an unpublished description by Ferdinand von Mueller and the description was published in Proceedings of the Royal Society of Victoria. The specimens were collected near Cudgewa by H.H.Treyvaud.

Distribution and habitat

References

treyvaudii
Malvales of Australia
Flora of New South Wales
Victoria
Taxa named by Ferdinand von Mueller